Lake Apiñaccocha (possibly from Quechua apiña, maswa a flowering, partly eatable plant, qucha lake) is a lake in Peru located in the Ayacucho Region, Lucanas Province, in the districts of Chipao and Puquio. Lake Apiñaccocha lies northeast of the town of Puquio and southeast of the lakes Yaurihuiri and Urqunqucha.

See also
List of lakes in Peru

References

Lakes of Peru
Lakes of Ayacucho Region